The DC Defenders are a professional American football team based in Washington, D.C. The team was founded by Vince McMahon’s Alpha Entertainment and is an owned-and-operated member of the new XFL owned by Dwayne Johnson’s Alpha Acquico. The Defenders play their home games at Audi Field.

History

McMahon era (2020)
On December 5, 2018, Washington D.C. was announced as one of eight cities that would join the newly reformed XFL, as well as  Seattle, Houston, Los Angeles, New York, St. Louis, Tampa Bay, and Dallas. On February 21, 2019, the team hired Pep Hamilton, who most recently was an assistant with the Michigan Wolverines football team, as their first head coach and general manager. Hamilton is an alumnus of Howard University and was familiar to XFL Commissioner Oliver Luck through Hamilton's work with Luck's son, a former NFL Quarterback, Andrew Luck. The team name and logo were revealed on August 21, 2019, as well as the teams uniforms on December 3, 2019.

On October 15, 2019, The Defenders announced their first player in team history, being assigned former Ohio State Buckeyes Quarterback Cardale Jones. Later that day, the 2020 XFL Draft took place. The Defenders selected Wide Receiver Rashard Davis with the first overall pick, but did not play for the team and later signed with the Tennessee Titans.

On February 8, 2020, the Defenders won the first game in modern XFL history, defeating the Seattle Dragons by a score of 31–19. On February 15, 2020, the Defenders beat the New York Guardians by a score of 27–0, which was the first shutout in modern XFL history. On March 12, 2020, The XFL announced that the remainder of the 2020 XFL season had been cancelled due to the COVID-19 pandemic. On April 10, 2020, The XFL suspended operations, with all employees, players and staff would be terminated.

Dwayne Johnson and Dany Garcia era (2023–present) 
On August 3, 2020, it was reported that a consortium led by Dwayne "The Rock" Johnson, Dany Garcia, and Gerry Cardinale (through Cardinale's fund RedBird Capital Partners) purchased the XFL for $15 million just hours before an auction could take place; the purchase received court approval on August 7, 2020. In March, 2022, a report emerged that Reggie Barlow would become the new Head Coach of the XFL D.C. Franchise, confirming that Washington D.C. would return as an XFL city. Barlow's hire was official on April 13, 2022, as well has the return of the D.C. Franchise on July 24, 2022. On October 31, 2022, The XFL officially announced that the Defenders name would be returning, this time with a brand new logo.

Market overview
The Baltimore–Washington area has a history of several teams in alternative professional football. The USFL had the Washington Federals (a mostly unsuccessful franchise) in its first two years. Then the Philadelphia/Baltimore Stars moved from Veterans Stadium in Philadelphia, Pennsylvania, to Byrd Stadium in College Park, Maryland, in 1985, winning the USFL's final championship. The Canadian Football League's Baltimore CFL Colts/Stallions were the only successful American team in the league during their two-year existence in the mid-1990s (and were the only American-based team to win the Grey Cup, the CFL's championship). Indoor teams to have played in Washington include the Washington Commandos and the Washington Valor (which folded two months before the Defenders' first game) of the Arena Football League, and the D.C. Armor of American Indoor Football Association, in addition to several teams based in Maryland.

The Defenders join the Washington Commanders ,  Washington Nationals ,  Washington Capitals ,  Washington Wizards, Washington Mystics ,  Washington Spirit , Capital City Go-Go , DC United, and Old Glory DC as Professional sports teams based in the Washington DC Metro area 

Defenders fans have taken up a tradition of assembling beer snakes out of empty beer containers. The snake constructed at the March 8, 2020 game vs the St. Louis BattleHawks ended up spanning several rows, including a contribution from former Commissioner Oliver Luck. 

In the 2023 season opener against the Seattle Sea Dragons, fans threw lemons onto the field after stadium security personnel confiscated several attempts at making a beer snake, delaying the game for a few minutes. This prompted the Defenders to discuss the issue with Audi Field security and set new guidelines that allowed the beer snake to return during the next home game on March 5.

Staff

Players

Current roster

Player and staff history

Head coach history

Offensive coordinator history

Defensive coordinator history

Former notable players 
 Tyree Jackson - Current Philadelphia Eagles Tight End
 Cardale Jones - Former Ohio State Buckeyes Quarterback, 2016 4th Round Pick
 Rahim Moore - Former Denver Broncos Defensive Back, 2011 2nd Round Pick
 Eli Rogers - Former Pittsburgh Steelers Wide Receiver

Current notable players 

 Ryquell Armstead - Former Jacksonville Jaguars Running Back, 2019 5th Round Pick
 Jordan Ta'amu - Former St. Louis BattleHawks Quarterback

References

External links